The 1997 Scottish League Cup final was played on 30 November 1997, at Ibrox Stadium in Glasgow and was the final of the 52nd Scottish League Cup competition. The final was contested by Celtic and Dundee United. Celtic won the match 3–0 thanks to goals by Marc Rieper, Henrik Larsson and Craig Burley.

Match details

References

External links
 Soccerbase

1997
Scottish League Cup Final 1997
Scottish League Cup Final 1997
League Cup Final
1990s in Glasgow
November 1997 sports events in the United Kingdom